William Reese Perkins ( – ) was an American cool jazz saxophonist and flutist, popular on the West Coast jazz scene, known primarily as a tenor saxophonist.

Born in San Francisco, California, United States, Perkins started performing in the big bands of Woody Herman and Jerry Wald. He worked for the Stan Kenton orchestra, which led to his entry into the cool jazz idiom. He began performing with Art Pepper and Bud Shank. He was also a member of The Tonight Show Band from 1970–1992 and The Lighthouse All-Stars. In the 1960s, Perkins had a second career as a recording engineer.

He died of cancer in his Sherman Oaks home at the age of 79.

Discography 
 The Brothers! with Al Cohn and Richie Kamuca (RCA Victor, 1955) 
 On Stage (Pacific Jazz, 1956)
 Tenors Head-On with Richie Kamuca (Liberty, 1957)
 Just Friends with Art Pepper, Richie Kamuca (Pacific Jazz, 1957)
 Bossa Nova with Strings Attached (Liberty, 1963)
 Quietly There (Riverside, 1966; released 1970)
 West Coast Conference (A World of Jazz, 1974)
 The Front Line with Pepper Adams (Trio, 1978)
 Confluence (Interplay, 1979)
 Serious Swingers with Bud Shank (Contemporary, 1987)
 Remembrance of Dino's (Interplay, 1989)
 I Wish On the Moon (Candid, 1992)
 Warm Moods with Frank Strazzeri (Fresh Sound, 1992)
 Live at the Royal Palms Inn Vol. 5 with Shorty Rogers (Woofy, 1994)
 Live at the Royal Palms Inn Vol. 9 with Pete Candoli, Carl Fontana (Woofy, 1994)
 Perk Playz Pres (Fresh Sound, 1996)
 Swing Spring (Candid, 1999)
 Live at the Lighthouse 1964 with J. C. Heard (Fresh Sound, 2019)

As sideman
With Chet Baker
 Chet Baker Big Band (Pacific Jazz, 1956)
 Pretty/Groovy (World Pacific, 1958)

With Louis Bellson
 Big Band Jazz from the Summit (Roulette, 1962)

With Nat King Cole
 L-O-V-E (Capitol, 1965)

With Clifford Coulter
 Do It Now! (Impulse!, 1971)

With Clare Fischer
 Thesaurus (Atlantic, 1969)

With Dizzy Gillespie
 The New Continent (Limelight, 1962)

With Stan Kenton
 Kenton Showcase (Capitol, 1954)
 Contemporary Concepts (Capitol, 1955)
 Kenton in Hi-Fi (Capitol, 1956)
 Kenton with Voices (Capitol, 1957)
 Rendezvous with Kenton (Capitol, 1957)
 Back to Balboa (Capitol, 1958)
 The Ballad Style of Stan Kenton (Capitol, 1958)
 The Stage Door Swings (Capitol, 1958)
 Kenton / Wagner (Capitol, 1964)
 Stan Kenton Conducts the Los Angeles Neophonic Orchestra (Capitol, 1965)

With Barney Kessel
 To Swing or Not to Swing (Contemporary, 1955)

With John Lewis,
 Grand Encounter (1956)

With Carmen McRae
 Can't Hide Love (Blue Note, 1976)

With Art Pepper and Conte Candoli
 Mucho Calor (Andex, 1957)

With André Previn
 The Subterraneans (Soundtrack) (MGM, 1960)

With Shorty Rogers
 Shorty Rogers Plays Richard Rodgers (RCA Victor, 1957)
 Afro-Cuban Influence (RCA Victor, 1958)
 Shorty Rogers Meets Tarzan (MGM, 1960)
 The Swingin' Nutcracker (RCA Victor, 1960)
 An Invisible Orchard (RCA Victor, 1961 [1997])
 Jazz Waltz (Reprise, 1962)

With Pete Rugolo
 10 Saxophones and 2 Basses (Mercury, 1961)

With Lalo Schifrin
 Bullitt (soundtrack) (Warner Bros., 1968)

With Bud Shank
 Bud Shank - Shorty Rogers - Bill Perkins (Pacific Jazz, 1955)
 Bud Shank & the Sax Section (Pacific Jazz, 1966)

With Gerald Wilson
 California Soul (Pacific Jazz, 1968)

References

1924 births
2003 deaths
Jazz musicians from San Francisco
Cool jazz saxophonists
Cool jazz flautists
West Coast jazz saxophonists
West Coast jazz flautists
Post-bop saxophonists
Hard bop saxophonists
Post-bop flautists
Hard bop flautists
American jazz tenor saxophonists
American male saxophonists
Candid Records artists
Blue Note Records artists
Contemporary Records artists
20th-century American saxophonists
20th-century American male musicians
American male jazz musicians
The Tonight Show Band members
20th-century flautists